Vladimir Sergeyevich Lisin (born 7 May 1956) is a Russian billionaire businessman. He is the chairman and majority shareholder of Novolipetsk (NLMK), one of the four largest steel companies in Russia.

According to Bloomberg Billionaires Index he is the richest man in Russia and 58th richest in the world in April 2021 with an estimated net worth of US$ 26.6 billion.

Background
Vladimir Lisin got his first job in 1975 working as a mechanic in a Soviet coalmine, and after studying at the Siberian Metallurgic Institute got a job working as a welder foreman at Tulachermet Metals Works. He rose through the ranks to become section manager, shop manager in 1979 and deputy chief engineer in 1986.

In 1992, he joined a group of traders (the Trans-World Group) who won control of Russia's steel and aluminium industry. When the partners split in 2000, he received 13% of the firm and later achieved a controlling share. His former boss was named the Minister for Russian Metallurgy, and Lisin became the sole owner of Novolipetsk Steel in 2000.

Since 1993, he has been a board member of several Russian metal producers, including NLMK, MMK and Sayansk and Novokuznetsk Aluminium Plants and has been a member of the board of directors of Novolipetsk Steel (NLMK) since 1996 and its chairman since 1998. He previously worked as deputy chief engineer and as deputy general director of the Karaganda Steel Plant, one of Kazakhstan's four largest steel plants.

Lisin was member of the board of directors of Zenit Bank. Lisin sits on the board of directors of the Novolipetskii Metallurgical Combine, one of largest steel companies in Russia, in 1998 and still holds that position. He is a director at CJSC Chernomorneftegaz. He was a Director of Norilsk Nickel Mining and Metallurgical Co. since 2002. He has been chairman of JSC Novolipetsk Iron & Steel Corporation (OJSC Novolipetsk Steel) since June 2007. He served as an independent member of the board of directors of OJSC United Shipbuilding Corporation in 2008–2012.

His business interests, apart from steel, include transportation and logistics (with stakes in St Petersburg Sea Port, Tuapse Commercial Sea Port, North-Western Shipping Company, Volga Shipping Company), energy (stakes in Chernomorneftegaz and Severneftegaz), and utilities (Russian grid companies Federal Grid Company and Distribution Grid Company of Center). These predominantly Russian assets are controlled via Fletcher Group Holdings.

Education and Metallurgical expertise
He graduated from the Siberian Metallurgic Institute in 1979 with a metallurgical engineering diploma specialising in "Foundry of irons and non-ferrous metals". In 1984 completed Postgraduate study in UKRNIIMET by correspondence (Kharkov, Ukraine). In 1989 he received an MSc in Metal Engineering from the Central Research Institute of ferrous metallurgy named after I. P. Bardin (Moscow). In 1990 he received a Diploma of the Higher commercial school under the All-Union Academy of Foreign Trade of People's Friendship Order, the training program "Administration and activity management of joint ventures in the territory of the USSR" (Moscow). In 1992 an MSc in Economics and Management from the Russian Presidential Academy of National Economy and Public Administration (RANEPA). In 1996 a Doctorate of the Moscow Institute of Steel and Alloys (MISiS), Faculty of engineering mechanics and in 1997 thesis for a Doctor's degree in Metal Engineering. In 1999 was a professor at RANEPA and in 2005 received a doctorate in economics.

He holds various patents for metallurgical processes and has published over 100 articles on metallurgy and economics, which include 15 monographs. He is a professor of the Academy of National Economy and the holder of the Council of Ministers' prize in the science and engineering (1989), the Honorary Metallurgist of Russia (1999), the Knight of the Order of Honour of the Russian Federation (2000) and the Knight of the Order of St. Sergiy Radonezhsky (2001).

Sports
Lisin is a shooting sports enthusiast. He was president of the European Shooting Confederation until October 2021, the Russia Shooting Union and has been appointed vice president of the Russian Olympic Committee. In 2013, Lisin was appointed as a member of the ISSF Executive Committee. He built one of Europe's largest shooting-range complexes in Lisya Nora, near Moscow. In November 2018, Lisin was elected president of the International Shooting Sport Federation, and succeeded Olegario Vázquez Raña, who had served as president since 1980.

Lisin was sanctioned by Australia after the 2022 Russian invasion of Ukraine. He resisted calls to step down as president, supported by the Russian-born ISSF Secretary General Alexander Ratner – who claimed that neither had any links to the Russian government.

Personal life
Lisin is married and has three children. According to Bloomberg L.P., Lisin bought the 17th-century Aberuchill Castle and its surrounding estate in Perthshire, Scotland in 2005.

Lisin was sanctioned by Australia after the 2022 Russian invasion of Ukraine. In March 2022 Lisin called for a peaceful resolution in a letter to staff at NLMK, writing that "Lost lives are always a huge tragedy that is impossible to justify. I am convinced that peaceful diplomatic conflict resolution is always preferable to the use of force." However, in September 2022 it was claimed that NLMK had supplied materials to Russian firms involved in nuclear weapon development, and that tankers owned by Lisin had participated in evading EU sanctions by trans-shipping oil at sea to EU-registered vessels. In October 2022, the US was urged to sanction Lisin.

See also
List of Russian billionaires

References

External link

Living people
Russian businesspeople in metals
Russian oligarchs
Russian billionaires
1956 births
Russian Orthodox Christians from Russia
Russian mining businesspeople
People from Ivanovo
Russian activists against the 2022 Russian invasion of Ukraine